Barzilai is a Hebrew surname. Notable people with the surname include:

Gad Barzilai (born 1958), Israeli professor of law, political science and international studies
Judah ben Barzilai, 12th century Catalan Talmudist
Netta Barzilai (born 1993), Israeli singer, recording artist and looping artist
Nir Barzilai, founding director of the Institute for Aging Research
Salvatore Barzilai (1860–1939), Italian journalist and politician 
Shmuel Barzilai (born 1957), Israeli cantor
Yisrael Barzilai (1913−1970), Israeli politician and government minister

See also
Barzilai Medical Center, a 617-bed hospital in Ashkelon, southern Israel
Joseph Berger-Barzilai (1904–1978), founding member and secretary of the Communist Party of Palestine
Barzillai, mentioned in the Old Testament
Barzali
Barzilay

Hebrew-language surnames

de:Barzilai
it:Barzilai